Lake Switzerland is a small reservoir located east-northeast of Fleischmanns in Delaware County, New York. Vly Creek flows through Lake Switzerland.

See also
 List of lakes in New York

References 

Lakes of New York (state)
Lakes of Delaware County, New York
Reservoirs in Delaware County, New York